Geet or The Song is a 1944 Bollywood film.  Geet was directed by S. U. Sunny and produced by Abdul Rashid Kardar.  The film starred Shahu Modak, Nirmala Devi, Aamir Ali, Shakir Ali and Chandabai. The music for the film was composed by Naushad, with lyrics by D. N. Madhok.

Cast
Shahu Modak
Nirmala Devi
Aamir Ali
Shakir Ali 
Chandabai
Zahid Ali

Soundtrack

References

External links
 

1944 films
1940s Hindi-language films
Indian drama films
1944 drama films
Indian black-and-white films
Hindi-language drama films